Hotshots is a 1984 Filipino youth-oriented musical film directed by Jeric Soriano on his directorial debut. The film stars Gary Valenciano on his theatrical debut, Herbert Bautista, Aga Muhlach, Raymond Lauchengco, Eula Valdez, Jobelle Salvador and Monette Rivera.

Cast
 Herbert Bautista as Boy
 Aga Muhlach as Archie
 Raymond Lauchengco as Danny
 Gary Valenciano as Mike
 Eula Valdez as Elaine
 Jobelle Salvador as Susan
 Monette Rivera as Alice
 Debraliz Valasote as Cynthia
 Paquito Salcedo as Lolo
 Naty Mallares as Lola
 Hector Reyes as Danny's Father
 Zorayda Sanchez as Ms. Armacost
 Ginny Lim as Cherry
 Carme Sanchez as Fat Lady
 Jose Antonio Barrios as Julius
 Jose Maria Barrios as Caesar
 Chesley Masias as Brutus
 Jay Garcia Ariño as Anne Marie
 Mary Joy Mañego as Nini
 Claudette Khan as Gigi
 Carolyn Calo as Cindy
 Rene Diaz as Little
 Josie Shoemaker as Alice's Maid
 Edna Vida Reyes as Ballet Instructor
 Nena Marquez as Alice's Mother
 Crispina dela Cruz as Debutante

Soundtrack

Accompanying the movie is its soundtrack, released in 1984 on Vicor Music subsidiary Sunshine Records.

References

External links

1984 films
Filipino-language films
Philippine musical films
Viva Films films
Hotshots OST
Hotshots OST